Akhada: The Authorized Biography of Mahavir Singh Phogat is the 2016 autobiography of the Indian wrestling coach and amateur wrestler Mahavir Singh Phogat. The book is his official autobiography by Saurabh Duggal. 

It traces Phogat's journey with his daughters and nieces hailing from a small village in Haryana to winning the medals for the country. The story was popularised as the Hindi biographical 2016 hit film Dangal.

See also 
 Dangal - the Hindi film based on the story 
 Phogat sisters – the sibling group featured in the book

References

2017 non-fiction books
Indian autobiographies
English-language books
Books about sports
Hachette (publisher) books